The 2019 South Africa Sevens was the second tournament within the 2019–20 World Rugby Sevens Series and the 21st South Africa Sevens tournament. It was held on 13–15 December 2019 at Cape Town Stadium in Cape Town, South Africa.

Fiji, the United States and South Africa – three of the top four teams from the 2018–19 World Rugby Sevens Series – were all drawn into Pool A.

Format
The 16 teams were drawn into four pools of four. Each team plays every other team in their pool once. The top two teams from each pool advance to the Cup playoffs and compete for gold, silver and bronze medals. The other teams from each pool go to the classification playoffs for 9th to 16th placings.

Teams
Fifteen core teams participated in the tournament along with one invited team, Japan.

Pool stage
All times in South African Standard Time (UTC+2:00)

Pool A

Pool B

Pool C

Pool D

Placement matches

Fifteenth place

Thirteenth place

Eleventh place

Ninth place

Knockout stage

Cup

Quarter-finals

Semi-finals

Third place

Final

Tournament placings

Dream Team
Runners-up and host team South Africa contributed three players to the tournament Dream Team.

References

2019
2019–20 World Rugby Sevens Series
2019 in South African rugby union
December 2019 sports events in South Africa